Michael Smith (born August 27, 1972) is a Canadian actor, screenwriter, comedian and musician. He is best known for his portrayal of Bubbles and co-writer of the cult classic television program, films and stage production Trailer Park Boys. He was also the guitarist for the Canadian rock band Sandbox. Smith earned a degree in English from St. Francis Xavier University in Antigonish, Nova Scotia. For a short time in 2006, he was engaged to actress Nichole Hiltz.

Musical interest
Smith showed early signs of musical talent, after learning to play the guitar at age six. Before becoming involved in Trailer Park Boys, he was a guitarist in the rock band Sandbox, and signed a record deal with EMI in Canada, and Nettwerk in the United States. Sandbox released two albums with EMI and Nettwerk, entitled Bionic and A Murder in the Glee Club. Sandbox was nominated for a Juno Award, East Coast Music Awards, and a CASBY Award.

Smith has worked on such films as The Weight of Water as a sound mixer   and Serendipity as a cableman.

Later, Smith performed as part of Bubbles & the Shit Rockers, a band that also featured founding Rush guitarist Alex Lifeson and Tom Wilson for the original song "Liquor & Whores" featured on Trailer Park Boys: The Movie Soundtrack. A Trailer Park Boys episode also features Smith's character Bubbles playing the 1977 Rush track "Closer to the Heart" with Alex Lifeson.

Smith has performed "Liquor & Whores" with Guns N' Roses on multiple occasions on their Chinese Democracy Tour Series, in 2006, 2010 and 2011.

Smith has also recorded with Emm Gryner in "Get Brave" released in 2010.

Acting career
Smith had been a long-time friend of Trailer Park Boys director Mike Clattenburg, and starred in "Cart Boy" with Robb Wells (who plays Ricky) and John Paul Tremblay (who plays Julian) in 1995.

Smith was "messing" around on the set one day and slipped into his Cart Boy character from the short "The Cart Boy". Clattenburg apparently realized the depth this character held, and the Cart Boy, now known as Bubbles, was written into the show. Bubbles was never intended to be a main character, but the more outrageously he behaved, the more audiences loved him, developing him to become a breakout character. Bubbles then became one of the three main protagonists, having established that he knew Julian and Ricky from school back in the late 1970s to high school in the late '80s.

Smith made an appearance as Bubbles in Snow's 2002 music video Legal, but his swearing remained censored. He was also featured in Country Star George Canyon's video for "Drinkin Thinkin", which showed Bubbles going after his girlfriend. Mike and the rest of the Trailer park boys appeared in The Tragically Hip video, "The Darkest One". He has appeared in character as Bubbles at several Guns N' Roses 2006 Canadian tour dates and dates in Australia and Japan in 2007. Bubbles, along with Ricky and Julian, hosted the 2006 and the 2007 East Coast Music Awards, in Charlottetown, Prince Edward Island and Halifax, Nova Scotia respectively.
  
In March 2008, Smith, along with three others, opened a sports bar in Halifax called "Bubba Ray's".

Smith also was involved in another bar, "Bubbles' Mansion", located in Downtown Halifax. The bar, partly owned by Smith, closed in March 2010 after 4 years of operation, a decision the management attributed to government hikes in the minimum wage and minimum drink prices.

In 2010, Smith reunited with many of his former Trailer Park Boys castmates in the new series The Drunk and On Drugs Happy Fun Time Hour.

He also performed a live version of "Closer to the Heart" with progressive rock band Rush.

On October 22, 2012, it was confirmed that Smith was to return to his role as Bubbles for a third feature length Trailer Park Boys film entitled "Don't Legalize It" which concluded filming in late April 2013. The film was released on April 18, 2014.

In the spring of 2013, Smith along with his Trailer Park Boys cohorts Wells and Tremblay started Swearnet, an internet-based television network that is entirely uncensored. The trio have also produced a film that is a fictional take on their website.

Personal life
In 2016, Smith was arrested in Los Angeles on suspicion of misdemeanor domestic battery. The alleged victim (who was not the person who called police) released a statement in support of Smith, and the charges were dropped.

Filmography

Film

Television

References

External links

 

1972 births
Male actors from Nova Scotia
Canadian male film actors
Canadian male television actors
Canadian male comedians
Canadian male voice actors
Canadian people of Irish descent
Living people
Musicians from Nova Scotia
People from New Glasgow, Nova Scotia
20th-century Canadian male actors
21st-century Canadian male actors